Sašo Mirjanič (27 January 1968 in Koper – 25 September 1994 in Žirovnica, Sevnica) was a  Slovenian rower and Olympic medallist at the 1992 Summer Olympics.

References 

1968 births
1994 deaths
Slovenian male rowers
Olympic rowers of Slovenia
Olympic rowers of Yugoslavia
Rowers at the 1988 Summer Olympics
Rowers at the 1992 Summer Olympics
Olympic bronze medalists for Slovenia
Olympic medalists in rowing
Medalists at the 1992 Summer Olympics